The 1911–12 NCAA men's basketball season began in December 1911, progressed through the regular season, and concluded in March 1912.

Season headlines 

 In February 1943, the Helms Athletic Foundation retroactively selected Wisconsin as its national champion for the 1911–12 season.
 In 1995, the Premo-Porretta Power Poll retroactively selected Wisconsin as its national champion for the 1911–12 season.

Conference membership changes

Regular season

Conference winners

Statistical leaders

Awards

Helms College Basketball All-Americans 

The practice of selecting a Consensus All-American Team did not begin until the 1928–29 season. The Helms Athletic Foundation later retroactively selected a list of All-Americans for the 1911–12 season.

Major player of the year awards 

 Helms Player of the Year: Eddie Calder, St. Lawrence (retroactive selection in 1944)

Coaching changes

References